Chengkouia is an extinct genus of corynexochid trilobites. It lived in what is now China, during the Botomian stage, which lasted from approximately 524 to 518.5 million years ago, in the Cambrian Period.

References

Corynexochida
Cambrian trilobites of Asia